The Murray hardyhead (Craterocephalus fluviatilis) is a species of fish in the family Atherinidae endemic to inland parts of southeastern Australia.  The fish is an omnivore, feeding on small crustaceans, aquatic insects and algae.

Conservation

The fish was once widespread and abundant in the Murray and Murrumbidgee River systems in southern NSW and northern Victoria. However, they have suffered a serious population decline and now seem to be limited to a few sites, mainly in northern Victoria. There are very few recent records of Murray hardyheads from NSW.

The main threat to remaining populations is increasing salinity and lack of water.

Murray hardyheads are now listed as an endangered species in NSW and threatened in Victoria. There are heavy penalties for harming, possessing, buying, or selling them.

References

External links
 Fishes of Australia : Craterocephalus fluviatilis

Murray hardyhead
Fish of the Murray-Darling basin
Endangered fauna of Australia
Murray hardyhead
Taxonomy articles created by Polbot